Cecil John Miller (December 28, 1928 – April 8, 1996), usually known as Jack Miller, was an American Presbyterian pastor. He served as pastor of New Life Presbyterian Church in Jenkintown, Pennsylvania, and taught practical theology at Westminster Theological Seminary.

Early life and education

Miller was born on December 28, 1928, in Gold Beach, Oregon.  He married Rose Marie Carlsen in 1950, and graduated from San Francisco State College in 1953. In 1966 he received an M.Div. from Westminster Theological Seminary and in 1978 earned his Ph.D. in English literature from the University of the Pacific.

Career

Starting in 1955, Miller taught at Ripon Christian School for five years in Ripon, California. He was ordained as a minister in the Orthodox Presbyterian Church in 1959, and worked as a chaplain for several years in Stockton, California. From 1965-1972 he served as the pastor of Mechanicsville Chapel in Mechanicsville, Pennsylvania.

Gary North argues that Miller was "deeply affected by the counter-culture", and this led him to adopt new, people-oriented approaches to evangelism. Chad B. Van Dixhoorn suggests that Miller's Sonship program stemmed from three and a half months spent in Spain overlooking the Mediterranean Sea. Miller "studied the promises of Scripture for three and a half months culminating in a mountaintop experience, or its seaside equivalent. He returned to America with two things on his mind, adoption and revival."

Miller founded World Harvest Mission (now named Serge) and the New Life Presbyterian network of Orthodox Presbyterian churches. He was known for emphasizing the Christian's status as a child of God, a view known as sonship theology. Tullian Tchividjian notes that Miller summed up the gospel in this way: "Cheer up; you're a lot worse off than you think you are, but in Jesus you're far more loved than you could have ever imagined."

Miller wrote a number of books, most notably Outgrowing the Ingrown Church (1986). A volume of his letters, The Heart of a Servant Leader, was published in 2004.

In 2020, P&R Publishing released a biography written by Michael A. Graham titled Cheer Up! The Life, Teaching, and Ministry of C. John ‘Jack’ Miller.

Death

Miller died on April 8, 1996, in Malaga, Spain.

References

1928 births
1996 deaths
American Presbyterian ministers
Orthodox Presbyterian Church ministers
Westminster Theological Seminary faculty
Westminster Theological Seminary alumni
San Francisco State University alumni
University of the Pacific (United States) alumni
People from Gold Beach, Oregon
20th-century American clergy